Elections to Shetland Islands Council were held on 4 May 2017 on the same day as the other Scottish local government elections. The election was the third using seven wards created as a result of the Local Governance (Scotland) Act 2004, each ward electing three or four Councillors using the single transferable vote system form of proportional representation, with 22 Councillors elected.

With the Shetland South ward going uncontested, the SNP elected its first councillor in Shetland.

Several members of the pro-Shetland Autonomy Wir Shetland group stood in the election; Ian Tinkler in Shetland West, and Alec Priest and Duncan Simpson in North Isles. Former Wir Shetland member Ryan Thomson also stood in North Isles. Whilst having left the group, it was claimed by the Wir Shetland Chairman that Thomson still supported the group's core aims. Other candidates with political positions of note included socialist Ian Scott and former Yes Scotland and Scottish Leave Left campaigner Brian Nugent in central ward. Nugent is an SNP member and claimed to be standing as an independent solely due to having applied too late to use the SNP party name in the election. Two paper candidates for the Conservatives also stood.

Election results

Note: "Votes" are the first preference votes. The net gain/loss and percentage changes relate to the result of the previous Scottish local elections on 3 May 2012. This may differ from other published sources showing gain/loss relative to seats held at dissolution of Scotland's councils.

Ward results

North Isles
2012: 3xIndependent
2017: 3xIndependent
2012-2017 Change: no change

Shetland North
2012: 3xIndependent
2017: 3xIndependent
2012-2017 Change: no change

Shetland West
2012: 3xIndependent
2017: 3xIndependent
2012-2017 Change: no change

Shetland Central
2012: 3xIndependent
2017: 3xIndependent
2012-2017 Change: no change

Shetland South
2012: 3xIndependent
2017: 2xIndependent, 1xScottish National Party
2012-2017 Change: SNP gain one seat from Independent

Lerwick North
2012: 3xIndependent
2017: 3xIndependent
2012-2017 Change: 3xIndependent

Lerwick South
2012: 4xIndependent
2017: 4xIndependent
2012-2017: no change

Retiring Councillors

Changes Since 2017
† Lerwick South Independent Beatrice Wishart was subsequently elected as Member of the Scottish Parliament for Shetland at the 2019 Shetland by-election as a Liberal Democrat. A by-election was held on 7 November 2019. It was held by Independent Stephen Flaws.
†† Shetland Central Independent Mark Burgess resigned his seat on 20 September 2019 for personal reasons. A by-election was held on 7 November 2019. The seat was retained by another Independent Moraig Lyall.

By-elections since 2017

Footnotes

2017
2017 Scottish local elections
21st century in Shetland